The 1972 Georgia Bulldogs football team represented the Georgia Bulldogs of the University of Georgia during the 1972 NCAA University Division football season.

Schedule

Source: 1973 Georgia Bulldogs Football Media Guide/Yearbook

Personnel

Season summary

at Ole Miss

References

Georgia
Georgia Bulldogs football seasons
Georgia Bulldogs football